Yoenlis Hernández is a Cuban boxer. He participated at the 2021 AIBA World Boxing Championships, being awarded the gold medal in the middleweight event.

References

External links 

Living people
Year of birth missing (living people)
Place of birth missing (living people)
Cuban male boxers
Middleweight boxers
AIBA World Boxing Championships medalists
21st-century Cuban people